The S13 is a regional railway line of the S-Bahn Zürich on the Zürcher Verkehrsverbund (ZVV), Zürich transportation network, in the cantons of  Schwyz and Zürich.

Route 
 

The line runs from Einsiedeln (SZ) to Wädenswil (ZH) on the Wädenswil–Einsiedeln railway line. Unlike other Zürich S-Bahn lines, it does not pass through Zürich HB. Connecting trains are offered at Biberbrugg (S31, S40, Voralpen-Express) and Wädenswil (S2, S8, S25, InterRegios).

The S13 is operated with single-deck Stadler FLIRT and FLIRT-III EMUs owned by Südostbahn (SOB).

Stations 
 Einsiedeln
 Biberbrugg
 Schindellegi-Feusisberg
 Samstagern
 Grüenfeld
 Burghalden
 Wädenswil

Scheduling 
The train frequency is usually 30 minutes and the trip takes 24 minutes.

See also 

 Rail transport in Switzerland
 Trams in Zürich

References 

 ZVV official website: Routes & zones

Zürich S-Bahn lines
Transport in the canton of Zürich
Canton of Schwyz